Luis Eduardo Fernández Oliva (born March 14, 1973 in Caracas) is a Venezuelan actor, writer, producer and director. He started his career on stage at age 19, and followed to film, television, radio and publishing. Fernández has won several acting awards, and recently has published several books, comprising the series Sexo Sentido ("The Sex Sense"), best-sellers in Latin America and very well received by the critics.
His tour-de-force performance in the film TAMARA earned him 5 international film festival awards for Best Actor.
He developed his directorial skills on stage and his directorial debut in filmmaking was with the short film Blue Sky produced at the New York Film Academy, which has been selected to the official competition in several international film festivals. He has performed for over three years his own stand-up show It's not you, it's me (No eres tú, soy yo), recording over 2000 performances.

Fernández is also an architect, having graduated in 1991 from the Universidad Simón Bolívar, in Caracas, and the Graduate School of Design of Harvard University. He is married to the Venezuelan actress Mimí Lazo.

Filmography

Theater

Director and producer
Golpes a mi puerta (Knocks At My Door), Caracas, 2007–2008; Bogotá, 2008. Also leading role, 2008.
Selection at the Bogota's International Theater Festival, 2008.
Opening Show, Caracas International Theater Festival, 2008.
No eres tú, soy yo (It’s Not You, It’s Me), Caracas, 2006–2008. Also writer and leading role.
Jav y Jos (Jav and Jos), Caracas 2005, Bogotá 2006, Madrid 2006. Also leading role.
El Aplauso va por dentro (The Applause Is Within You), Madrid, 2004. Producer only.

Other leading roles
Don Juan Tenorio, Los Angeles Theater Center, Los Angeles, 1998.
El Pez que Fuma (The Smoking Fish), Caracas, 1994.
El Príncipe Constante (The Constant Prince), Caracas, 1992.
Municipal Award, Best Actor, 1992.
Cyrano de Begerac, Caracas, 1991.
La Hora del Lobo (Bergman's The Hour of the Wolf), Caracas, 1991.
Self-Portrait of an Artist, Caracas, Bogotá, Essen (Germany), 1990.

Writer
La cruenta venganza del hombre que todos querían ser (The Gruesome Revenge Of the Man Everyone Wanted To Be). The New Game, 2004. Novel.
Sexo Sentido (The Sex Sense). Criteria, 2005. Essay. Six months in the top 10 best-sellers list in Venezuela.
Sexo Sentido II: Mis primeras quininetas (The Sex Sense II: My First Five Hundred). Ediciones B, 2006. Essay. One year in the Top 10 best-sellers list in Venezuela.
Agenda Sexo Sentido (The Sex Sense Calendar). Ediciones B, 2007–2008. Calendar.
Sexo Sentido III: No eres tú, soy yo (The Sex Sense 3: It’s Not You, It’s Me). Ediciones B. Essay. Independently published February, 2019
A weekly columnist of EME magazine, the Thursday's publication by the Venezuelan journal El Nacional.  (www.el-nacional.com)

Radio
For over three years Fernández was the creator and host of the radio show The Sex Sense, that premiered in May 2004 to become an audience phenomenon on Venezuelan radio. Fernández interviewed more than one thousand successful professional women from Venezuela, Latin America and Spain. This show became the basis of his on-going stand-up show It’s not you, it’s me that has been seen by over 500,000 audience members in more than 400 performances since 2006.

References

External links
 

Male actors from Caracas
20th-century Venezuelan male actors
1973 births
Living people
Harvard Graduate School of Design alumni
Simón Bolívar University (Venezuela) alumni
21st-century Venezuelan male actors
Venezuelan male telenovela actors
Venezuelan male television actors
Venezuelan male film actors
Venezuelan male stage actors